Australasia is the debut full-length debut album by Chicago post-metal band Pelican. It was released November 4, 2003 on Hydra Head Records.

Guitarist Trevor de Brauw has noted that because of budget restrictions, the Australasia sessions had to be rushed. The studio was also under construction during recording and had a few impediments. Despite this, critical reception has been largely positive.

The track "Drought" was used in the 2009 war film The Messenger.

Reception

Track listing 
All tracks written by Pelican.

Vinyl version

Personnel 

Band members
 Trevor de Brauw – guitar
 Bryan Herweg – bass, cover and insert photography
 Larry Herweg – drums
 Laurent Schroeder-Lebec – guitar

Other personnel
 Andrew Furse – singing saw on the untitled track
 Jason Hellman – album artwork and design
 Sanford Parker – production and mixing
 Aaron Turner – album artwork and design
 Gregory White – cover and insert photography
 Nick Zampiello – mastering

References 

Pelican (band) albums
2003 debut albums
Hydra Head Records albums
Albums with cover art by Aaron Turner